He Shengming (born He Min on July 9, 1976) is a Chinese actor and singer. Born in Xiantao, Hubei, He moved to Guangzhou, Guangdong in the early 1990s to pursue a music career. Along with Peng Liang and Yang Guang, they formed the boy band China Power in 1996, with He as their main vocalist. He left the band in 1998 and released his first single "Solo" that same year, performing under the name He Weiqi.

He has recently found success in his performances in Mainland Chinese television dramas, most of them Yu Zheng productions. He's popularity in dramas also revived his music career, which suffered ever since he left China Power in 1998.

Career
He Min was born in Xiantao, Hubei, People's Republic of China on July 9, 1976. He has one older brother, Hairong. As a result, close relatives and friends often call him Xiao Hai ("Little Hai"). In 1996, He moved to Guangzhou, Guangdong and formed the short-lived boy band China Power with members Peng Liang and Yang Guang. China Power was extremely popular in the Cantonese music scene, and the group won "Best Group" at the first annual Chinese Singing Awards, which was held in Hong Kong in 1997.

As the lead vocalist, He was the most popular member. In 1998, He left the group and released his first single "Solo" under the stage name He Weiqi to support a Shenzhen food company. He released his first complete album in 1999, which only received lukewarm responses. He announced his indefinite leave in the industry and enrolled in the Beijing Film Academy, occasionally filming for several dramas.

He attempted to return to the music scene in 2005, using his first stage name He Min. He was unsuccessful, and retired to working as a backstage visual supervisor instead.

Yu Zheng, one of Mainland China's most popular television drama producers, discovered He and cast him a role in Rose Martial World (2008), which propelled He to stardom. Following Rose, He continued his collaboration with Yu in other big-budgeted works, such as Beauty's Rival in Palace (2009), Pretty Maid (2009), and Happy Mother-in-Law, Pretty Daughter-in-Law (2010). He is perhaps best known for his role as the Fourth Imperial Prince on the 2011 period drama Palace, also a Yu Zheng production. He  has since starred in many signature Yu Zheng dramas, namely Abandoned Secret, Spell of the Fragrance, Palace II, Beauty World, Desperate Love, and Allure Love.

He has since transitioned to more serious acting, take on roles in spy and war dramas Tongbai Hero and Hunt Wolf. He also starred in the medical drama OB Gyns, gaining recognition with his acting; and as an antagonist in the wuxia drama The Four.

Filmography

Film

Television series

Discography

Albums

Singles

Soundtracks

Awards

References

External links
Sina profile

1976 births
Living people
Male actors from Hubei
People from Xiantao
Beijing Film Academy alumni
Chinese Mandopop singers
Musicians from Hubei
Cantopop singers
Singers from Hubei
Chinese television producers
Chinese male film actors
Chinese male television actors
21st-century Chinese male actors
21st-century Chinese male singers